Joel David Horton (born October 30, 1959) is an American lawyer and retired judge from Idaho. He is a former justice of the Idaho Supreme Court, appointed

Early life and education 
Born in Nampa, Idaho, Horton lived in Lewiston as a youth and later in Boise; he graduated from Borah High School in Boise in 1977. He attended the University of Washington in Seattle and received a B.A. in political science in 1982. Horton then attended the University of Idaho in Moscow and received his J.D. from its College of Law

Career 
A district judge in Boise, Horton was appointed to the state's highest court  by Governor Butch Otter in September 2007 to fill the vacancy of the retiring Linda Copple Trout. He narrowly retained his seat in the statewide election (50.1%) in  but was re-elected by a wide margin (65.8%) six years later 

In June 2018, Horton announced he would retire at the end of December.

References

External links
 Idaho Supreme Court – Joel Horton
 Vote Smart – Joel Horton

1959 births
Living people
Justices of the Idaho Supreme Court
People from Boise, Idaho
People from Nampa, Idaho
University of Idaho alumni
University of Washington College of Arts and Sciences alumni
21st-century American judges
University of Idaho College of Law alumni